Les Diaboliques (released as Diabolique in the United States and variously translated as The Devils or The Fiends) is a 1955 French psychological horror thriller film directed by Henri-Georges Clouzot, starring Simone Signoret, Véra Clouzot, Paul Meurisse and Charles Vanel.  It is based on the novel She Who Was No More (Celle qui n'était plus) by Pierre Boileau and Thomas Narcejac.

The story blends elements of thriller and horror, with the plot focusing on a woman and her husband's mistress who conspire to murder the man. The film was the 10th-highest grossing film of the year in France, with a total of 3,674,380 admissions. The film also received the 1954 Louis Delluc Prize.

Clouzot, after finishing The Wages of Fear, optioned the screenplay rights, preventing Alfred Hitchcock from making the film. This movie helped inspire Hitchcock's Psycho. Robert Bloch, the author of the novel Psycho, stated in an interview that his all-time favorite horror film was Les Diaboliques.

Plot
A second-rate boarding school in Saint-Cloud, Hauts-de-Seine, in the Paris metropolitan area, is run by the tyrannical and cruel Michel Delassalle. The school is owned, though, by Delassalle's teacher wife, the frail Christina, an emigrée from Venezuela. Michel also has a relationship with Nicole Horner, another teacher at the school. Rather than antagonism, the two women have a somewhat close relationship, primarily based on their apparent mutual hatred of Michel. He is cruel to the students, beats Nicole, and mocks Christina about her heart condition.

Unable to stand his mistreatment any longer, Nicole devises a plan to get rid of Michel forever. Though hesitant at first, Christina ultimately consents to help Nicole. Using a threatened divorce to lure Michel to Nicole's apartment building in Niort, a town several hundred kilometers away, Christina sedates him. The two women then drown him in a bathtub and, driving back to the school, dump his body in the neglected swimming pool. When his corpse floats to the top, they think it will appear to have been an accident. Almost everything goes according to their plans until the body fails to surface. Michel's corpse is nowhere to be found when the pool is drained. Then, the suit that Michel had been wearing when they drowned him is returned from the dry cleaners. When the proprietor of the dry cleaners also returns a key to a room in nearby hotel that was with the clothes, Christina goes to the room. There the cleaning man tells her that Michel had kept the room for awhile but was rarely if ever seen and stored nothing there.

Nicole sees in the paper that the police have found the corpse. However, when Christina goes to the morgue, she finds it is not actually Michel's body. There, she meets Alfred Fichet, a retired senior policeman now working as a private detective. He becomes involved in the case, much to Nicole's chagrin.

Christina, Nicole and other teachers find a student who claims that Michel has ordered him to rake leaves as punishment for breaking a window. After hearing this, Christina's heart condition grows worse, and her doctors fear she may die soon unless she maintains strict bed rest. When the school photograph is taken, the result seems to show Michel's spectral figure in the window behind the students. Unnerved, Nicole leaves the school; she asks Christina to come too, but she is too ill and afraid.

Christina, overcome by fear, tells Alfred everything. He does not believe her, but he investigates the pool. That night, Christina hears noises and wanders around the school. When she realizes that someone is following her, she runs back to her room. There she finds Michel's corpse submerged in the bathtub, which is full of water. Michel rises from the tub, and Christina has a heart attack and dies. Michel and Nicole have set up Christina from the beginning, with Michel acting as a vengeful ghost to scare Christina to death. However, Alfred hears their celebration and figures out everything, telling them they will get 15 to 20 years, depending on the judge.

The school is closed in the wake of the scandal. As the children and teachers leave, the same boy who had earlier broken a window breaks another. When asked how he got his slingshot back, the boy says that Christina gave it to him.

Cast
 Simone Signoret as Nicole Horner
 Véra Clouzot as Christina Delassalle
 Paul Meurisse as Michel Delassalle
 Charles Vanel as Alfred Fichet
 Jean Brochard as Plantiveau
 Pierre Larquey as M. Drain
 Michel Serrault as M. Raymond
 Thérèse Dorny as Mme. Herboux
 Noël Roquevert as M. Herboux
 Georges Poujouly as Soudieu
 Aminda Montserrat as Mme. Plantiveau
 Madeleine Suffel as la dégraisseuse
 Jean Témerson as le garçon d'hôtel
 Jacques Hilling as l'employé de l'institut médico-légal
 Robert Dalban as le pompiste

Johnny Hallyday appears uncredited as one of the pupils.

Production

Writing
It was Clouzot's wife Vera who drew his attention to the Boileau-Narcejac novel. Clouzot read it through the night and optioned the rights in the morning. He and his brother Jean (who took the pseudonym Jérôme Géronimi) spent 18 months adapting the novel. In the book, the action takes place between Enghien-les-Bains and Nantes but Clouzot transposed it to Saint-Cloud and Niort, his own birthplace. He wasn’t particularly interested in the insurance scam that was the criminal motive in the book. He switched the gender of the murderers and invented the private-school setting. Susan Hayward suggests that the gender switch made by Clouzot was caused not so much by censorship considerations (in the source novel, Lucienne and Mireille turn out to be a pair of lesbian lovers) but by his desire to create a sizeable role for his wife. The book has only one principal female character, Lucienne, since the supposed victim, Mireille disappears early on. Vera with her distinctly feminine demeanor was ill-suited for the role of Lucienne (called Nicole in the film). So in Clouzot’s script, Mireille (now named Christina) is the one who has a weak heart, and is the object of manipulation of her husband Michel and his mistress Nicole. Clouzot also followed the convention that the culprits should be exposed by the detective in the end (another departure from the novel where the authors let them get away).

Casting
Clouzot cast Simone Signoret in the role of Nicole. He previously filmed her husband Yves Montand in The Wages of Fear, and the two couples became friends. The director was also aware of Vera’s limitations as an actress and needed someone to lend her support in such a demanding role. Signoret signed an eight-week contract but the shooting actually took 16 weeks. She ended up being paid for only eight weeks of work despite staying until the end of the filming because she neglected to read the small print.  Signoret’s co-star Paul Meurisse also recalls in his memoirs that the actress was further bemused by Clouzot’s constant attempts to find clever ways of lighting Vera's face while muting the light on Signoret so she wouldn't upstage his wife.

Clouzot knew Paul Meurisse back from 1939 when the latter was trying to pursue a singing career. Clouzot then was trying to sell his song lyrics to Edith Piaf, Meurisse's lover at the time. By the late 1940s Meurisse had become an established stage and screen actor, known for the roles of icy and sophisticated villains, and he seemed a natural choice for the role of Michel.

The film featured two Clouzot regulars: Pierre Larquey as M. Drain and Noël Roquevert as M. Herboux. Michel Serrault made his screen debut as M. Raymond, one of the schoolteachers. Charles Vanel—who previously co-starred in Clouzot's The Wages of Fear—was cast as the seemingly inept Inspector Fichet.

Clouzot also auditioned 300 children and selected 35. Among them were Jean-Philippe Smet (the future Johnny Hallyday), Patrick Dewaere's brother Yves-Marie Maurin, and Georges Poujouly, who previously received acclaim in René Clément's Forbidden Games.

Filming
The filming began on August 18, 1954 and finished on November 30 the same year. Clouzot asked his assistant Michel Romanoff to find a suitable filming location for the boarding school. The latter discovered a decrepit chateau in L'Etang-la-Ville between Saint-Cloud and the Bois-du-Boulogne. The building and its surroundings matched the director’s vision perfectly since they projected the desired mood of decay and neglect. The adjacent swimming pool was dirty and full of slime. Clouzot spent five weeks shooting at this location.

The screenplay placed Nicole’s house in Niort, but the actual house used for the filming was in Montfort-l'Amaury, just opposite the building that previously appeared in Clouzot's Le Corbeau. The morgue scenes were shot in the Institut Médico-légal in Paris. The rest was filmed at Saint-Maurice Studios southeast of Paris which took additional nine weeks.

The cinematographer Armand Thirard used two camera crews to speed up the shooting that was falling behind the schedule. Despite his efforts, the filming took twice longer than the projected 48 days.

Originally the film was to be called Les Veuves (‘The widows’) but this was deemed unmarketable. Eleven weeks into filming it was changed to Les Démoniaques. Eventually it was renamed Les Diaboliques but this title was already used for a collection of short stories by the 19th century writer Barbey d'Aurevilly. Clouzot was permitted to use this title but only on the condition if he gave the author a proper mention. He did it by opening the film with a quote from the preface to d’Aurevilly's work: "A portrait is always moral when it is tragic and shows the horror of the things it represents."

Release
The film created a sensation upon its original release and was a success at the box office with 3,674,380 admissions in France alone. It has often been likened to the films of Alfred Hitchcock; some sources say that Alfred Hitchcock missed out on purchasing the rights to the Boileau and Narcejac novel by just a few hours, Clouzot getting to the authors first. The end credit contains an early example of an "anti-spoiler message."

Critical reception
Bosley Crowther gave the film an enthusiastic review in The New York Times, calling it "one of the dandiest mystery dramas that has shown here" and "a pip of a murder thriller, ghost story and character play rolled into one". He added "the writing and the visual construction are superb, and the performance by top-notch French actors on the highest level of sureness and finesse." The Chicago Daily Tribune wrote, "If you like a good mystery and can stand it fairly morbid and uncompromising as to detail, this is one of the best offerings in a long time." The reviewer added, "You may suspect, as I did, one of the answers as the film nears its finale, but if you solve it all, you've missed your profession." Variety was more critical: “Although this has a few hallucinating bits of terror, the film is primarily a creaky-door type of melodrama. Its macabre aspects and lack of sympathy for the characters make this a hybrid which flounders between a blasting look at human infamy and an out-and-out contrived whodunit." The National Board of Review named it among the best foreign films of 1955, and called it "a genuine thriller—a shocking, satisfying chunk of Grand Guignol psychological suspense."

British reviews were negative on first release. Milton Shulman in the Sunday Express accused the film of "calculated malevolence," and commented that "it is no trick to sicken an audience by such blunt methods as these." C.A. Lejeune in The Observer called it "extremely clever and very horrid," and complained about "a vogue at the moment for the horrid in entertainment." Reg Whiteley in the Daily Mirror described it as "a suspenseful but sordid slice of French life," and exclaimed: "Just how horrible can films get?"

Roger Ebert, reviewing the 1995 re-release, wrote: "The famous plot of the movie usually deceives first-time viewers, at least up to a point. The final revelations are somewhat disappointing, but Clouzot doesn't linger over them. The most disturbing elements of the movie are implied, not seen." Time Out commented that the film "makes for a great piece of Guignol misanthropy" where "everyone is in the end a victim, and their actions operate like snares setting traps that leave them grasping for survival."

On review aggregator Rotten Tomatoes, Les Diaboliques holds an approval rating of 95%, based on 85 reviews, and an average rating of 8.6/10. Its consensus reads, "Cruel, dark, but undeniably effective, Diabolique is a suspense thriller as effective as Hitchcock's best work and with a brilliant twist ending."

Awards
1954: Louis Delluc Prize - Best Film
1955: New York Film Critics Circle Awards - Best Foreign Film
1956: Edgar Allan Poe Awards - Best Foreign Film

Legacy and remakes
The film gained additional press when, only five years after its release, Véra Clouzot died of a heart attack, aged 46, somewhat mirroring her character in the film, who also had heart problems.

Les Diaboliques is now considered a classic of the horror genre and film in general. Kim Newman wrote in Empire: "The horrific mystery has lost only a fraction of its power over the years, though literally dozens of films (see: Deathtrap, Hush... Hush, Sweet Charlotte, Games etc.) have borrowed part or all of its tricky storyline. This was one of the first movies to depend on a twist ending which forces you to reassess everything you thought you had been told earlier in the film." The British Film Institute included it in their list of the 100 Best Thrillers of All Time, calling it "a compelling, grisly thriller... capped by an unforgettable twist ending." The Guardian listed is as No 19 among the 25 best horror films of all time.

The scene in which Christina's husband emerges from the bathtub ranked #49 on Bravo's 100 Scariest Movie Moments.

In 1964, TV writer/producer/director Joseph Stefano was evidently inspired by this movie to do a pilot for a thriller anthology series for the American Broadcasting Company (ABC).  Called "The Unknown," the pilot failed to take off.  So Stefano rewrote and reshot it—adding fantasy elements in the process—as an episode of The Outer Limits (1963 TV series) called "The Forms of Things Unknown."  Both versions starred Vera Miles as Kassia Paine, Barbara Rush as Leonora Raymond, and Scott Marlowe as their sadistic blackmailer-returned-from-the-dead, Andre Pavan.

The 1967 film Games, written by Gene R. Kearney and directed by Curtis Harrington, and starring James Caan and Katharine Ross, has a different basic situation, but similar twists at the end, and again features Simone Signoret as the corrupt woman of mystery.

British filmmaker Jimmy Sangster cited it as a major influence on his writing and directing, stating:  "most of my 'psycho' type movies ... were derivative of each other and they all went back to my original inspiration: Les Diaboliques. I'm not the only one to follow that path. I guess I just did it more than most."

An American version of Les Diaboliques, titled Reflections of Murder, was made by ABC-TV in 1974 with Tuesday Weld, Joan Hackett, and Sam Waterston. In 1993, another made-for-television movie remake was made; this one was titled House of Secrets, and it starred Melissa Gilbert. In 1996, the film was remade again as Diabolique, adapted by Don Roos, directed by Jeremiah S. Chechik, and starring Sharon Stone and Isabelle Adjani in the leading female roles, with Chazz Palminteri as the husband and Kathy Bates as the detective.

Home media
The film was released on DVD by The Criterion Collection in July 1999 and was then re-released on DVD and Blu-ray in May 2011. The latter release features selected-scene commentary by French-film scholar Kelley Conway, a new video introduction by Serge Bromberg, and a new video interview with novelist and film critic Kim Newman.

References

External links
 
 
 
 
Diabolique: Murder Considered as One of the Fine Arts, an essay by Terrence Rafferty at the Criterion Collection 
Diabolique, an essay by Danny Peary at the Criterion Collection

1955 films
1955 horror films
1950s psychological thriller films
Adultery in films
Films set in boarding schools
Edgar Award-winning works
Film noir
French neo-noir films
Films based on French novels
Films based on mystery novels
Films based on works by Boileau-Narcejac
Films directed by Henri-Georges Clouzot
Films set in schools
French black-and-white films
French horror films
French thriller films
Louis Delluc Prize winners
Films with screenplays by Henri-Georges Clouzot
1950s French-language films
1950s French films